Early general elections were held in Sint Maarten on 17 September 2010 to elect the 15 members of the Island Council. The National Alliance led by William Marlin emerged as the largest party, winning 7 of the 15 seats. However, a coalition government was formed by the Democratic Party and the United People's Party. Despite only having won two seats, the Democratic Party's Sarah Wescot-Williams became Prime Minister.

Background
Early elections were needed because the Island Council was enlarged from 11 to 15 seats.

Results

Aftermath
The Island Council was converted into the  Estates of Sint Maarten after Sint Maarten received country status within the Kingdom of the Netherlands on 10 October 2010.

References

General election
Sint Maarten
Sint Maarten
Elections in Sint Maarten